This is a list of sail codes for sailing yachts and the old codes, used until 2000 by the International Sailing Federation.

Mainsail Country Codes must comply with World Sailing Racing Rules of Sailing. ISAF Rules of Sailing Appendix G1.2 specifies that national letters shall be clearly legible and of the same color. 

They must be placed below the class insignias and above the sail number.

List

Notes

Sail codes
Sail codes
Sail codes